Carlos Eduardo Hernández (born March 11, 1997) is a Venezuelan professional baseball pitcher for the Kansas City Royals of Major League Baseball (MLB). He made his MLB debut in 2020.

Career
Hernández signed with the Kansas City Royals as an international free agent on July 19, 2016, for a $15,000 signing bonus. He spent his professional debut season of 2017 with the Burlington Royals, pitching to a 1–4 win–loss record with a 5.49 earned run average (ERA) and 62 strikeouts over  innings. He spent the 2018 season with the Lexington Legends, going 6–5 with a 3.29 ERA and 82 strikeouts over  innings. Hernández suffered a stress fracture in his rib cage during spring training in 2019, and did not make his season debut until June 21. He split the 2019 season between the AZL Royals, Burlington, and Lexington, going a combined 3–5 with a 5.31 ERA and 68 strikeouts over  innings.

Hernández was added to the Royals 40–man roster following the 2019 season.

On September 1, 2020, Hernández was promoted to the major leagues for the first time and made his debut that day against the Cleveland Indians, pitching  scoreless innings. With the 2020 Kansas City Royals, Hernández appeared in five games, compiling an 0–1 record with a 4.91 ERA and 13 strikeouts in  innings pitched. In 2021, he compiled a 6–2 record with 3.68 ERA and 74 strikeouts in  innings.

References

External links

1997 births
Living people
Arizona League Royals players
Burlington Royals players
Kansas City Royals players
Lexington Legends players
Major League Baseball pitchers
Major League Baseball players from Venezuela
Omaha Storm Chasers players
People from Ciudad Guayana
Venezuelan expatriate baseball players in the United States
2023 World Baseball Classic players